Scott is the fourth largest municipality in Lafayette Parish, Louisiana, United States. The population 8,614 as of the 2010 U.S. census, and 8,119 at the 2020 census, up from 7,870 at the 2000 census. Scott is a suburban community of Lafayette and is part of the Lafayette metropolitan statistical area in Acadiana.

History
In 1902, Gabby Anderson built a western-style saloon to serve as "an exclusive, all-men's bar and a meeting place for old folks." His reason for the saloon is because he believed "this is where the West begins." However, it is believed that the slogan started because Scott was where eastern train fare rates ended and western train, referred to as the "West Line", fare rates began.

The Union Pacific Railroad, formerly the Southern Pacific Railway, cuts the town in two. The first settler of Scott was Alexander Delhomme, who took land in the northern part of the town. Delhomme owned the first hay-mowing machine, grist mill and cotton gin. By 1880, the train depot was completed and the town became a village. In 1907, the town was incorporated and named after J. B. Scott, who was division superintendent of the Southern Pacific Railroad. The village became a town in 1960, and the town became a city in 1990.

On April 12, 2012, Scott was designated by the Louisiana State Legislature as the "Boudin Capital of the World", referring to Cajun sausage. This meant that two other Louisiana towns needed to relinquish their titles. Broussard, also in Lafayette Parish, is now known as the "former Boudin Capital of the World" but has adopted the unofficial title of "Intergalactic Boudin Capital of Positive Infinity", and Jennings, in Jefferson Davis Parish, owns the title of "Boudin Capital of the Universe". The city of Scott's claim to the title is substantial, with more boudin purveyors per-capita than any other place in the state and a couple of the more prominent boudin makers to boot, no other city in Louisiana produces more links than Scott.

Geography
Scott is located in west-central Lafayette Parish at  (30.237951, -92.091996). It is bordered to the east and south by Lafayette, the parish seat, and to the north by unincorporated Ossun.

U.S. Route 90 passes through the center of Scott as Cameron Street, leading east  to the center of Lafayette and west the same distance to Duson. Interstate 10 passes through the north side of Scott, with access from Exit 97 (Louisiana Highway 93). I-10 leads east  to Baton Rouge, the state capital, and west  to Lake Charles. LA 93 also passes through the center of Scott, leading north and east  to Arnaudville and south  to the southern part of Lafayette.

Demographics

As of the 2020 United States census, there were 8,119 people, 3,391 households, and 2,291 families residing in the city. At the 2019 American Community Survey, the racial and ethnic makeup of the city was 77.6% non-Hispanic white, 11.7% Black and African American, 0.3% American Indian and Alaska Native, 5.3% Asian, 2.2% some other race, and 2.9% multiracial. Hispanics and Latin Americans of any race made up 11.6% of the population. In 2019, the median household income was $54,551 and the poverty rate was 12.5%.

According to the 2000 census, there were 7,870 people, 2,920 households, and 2,143 families residing in the city. The racial makeup of the city was 85.78% White, 11.56% African American, 0.33% Native American, 0.95% Asian, 0.01% Pacific Islander, 0.50% from other races, and 0.86% from two or more races. Hispanic or Latin Americans of any race were 1.30% of the population.

There were 2,920 households, out of which 42.5% had children under the age of 18 living with them, 54.5% were married couples living together, 14.6% had a female householder with no husband present, and 26.6% were non-families. 20.8% of all households were made up of individuals, and 5.7% had someone living alone who was 65 years of age or older. The average household size was 2.69 and the average family size was 3.13.

In the city, the population was spread out, with 30.0% under the age of 18, 10.8% from 18 to 24, 33.1% from 25 to 44, 18.9% from 45 to 64, and 7.2% who were 65 years of age or older. The median age was 31 years. For every 100 females, there were 93.0 males. For every 100 females age 18 and over, there were 87.2 males.

The median income for a household in the city was $37,320, and the median income for a family was $41,538. Males had a median income of $31,446 versus $22,229 for females. The per capita income for the city was $15,469. About 11.9% of families and 14.2% of the population were below the poverty line, including 15.2% of those under age 18 and 22.9% of those age 65 or over.

Notable person
 Zachary Richard, Cajun singer, songwriter and poet

References

External links
Official website

Populated places established in 1907
Cities in Louisiana
Cities in Lafayette Parish, Louisiana
Cities in Lafayette, Louisiana metropolitan area